Glynwood is an unincorporated community located in southwestern Moulton Township, in Auglaize County, Ohio, United States.

It is located between Wapakoneta and Saint Marys. The community is served by the Saint Marys City School District and the Saint Marys (45885) post office.

A community landmark is St. Patrick's Catholic Church, which is listed on the National Register of Historic Places.

References

Unincorporated communities in Auglaize County, Ohio
Unincorporated communities in Ohio